Willads Blaxkjær Delvin (born 2 May 2001) is a Danish professional footballer who plays for Lyngby.

Club career
He made his Danish Superliga debut for Lyngby on 23 October 2020 in a game against OB. He suffered relegation to the Danish 1st Division with the club on 9 May 2021 after a loss to last placed AC Horsens.

References

External links
 

2001 births
Living people
Danish men's footballers
Association football forwards
Lyngby Boldklub players
Danish Superliga players
Holbæk B&I players